Grand-Vivy Castle is a castle in the former municipality of Barberêche (now part of Courtepin) in the Canton of Fribourg in Switzerland.  It is a Swiss Heritage Site of National Significance.

The furthest to the north-east, of Barberêche's three castles, Grand-Vivy Castle is located on a narrow outcrop between the Schiffenensee and a small side stream. This was also the site of a mediaeval castle, but this was replaced by today's late-Gothic structure with its semicircular stairway tower, and other tower construction. The chapel next to the castle was built in the 17th century.

See also
List of castles and fortresses in Switzerland

References

External links

Grand-Vivy Castle 

Castles in the canton of Fribourg
Cultural property of national significance in the canton of Fribourg